The Yayoi Kusama Museum is a contemporary art museum in Tokyo, Japan dedicated to the work of the Japanese artist Yayoi Kusama. The Museum is located in the Shinjuku Ward, in the western suburbs of Tokyo, Japan.

The five-floor building was designed by the Japanese architecture firm Kume Sekkei. Construction was completed in 2014, and it opened in 2017 with an inaugural exhibition of 600 of Kusama's works. One floor of the museum is dedicated to one of Kusama's infinity room installations, titled “Pumpkins Screaming About Love Beyond Infinity.

The museum admits 200 visitors per day, based on timed tickets. In 2018, a year after its opening, the museum was rated number one on Time Out's global do list.

See also
 List of single-artist museums

References

External links
Official website 

 Pumpkins Screaming About Love Beyond Infinity Exhibit 

2017 establishments in Japan
Buildings and structures in Shinjuku
Art galleries established in 2017
Contemporary art galleries in Japan
Kusama, Yayoi
Art museums and galleries in Tokyo
Museums devoted to one artist